Sceaux is a station on the line B of the Réseau Express Régional, a hybrid suburban commuter and rapid transit line. It is named after the town where it is located, Sceaux.

References

See also

 List of stations of the Paris RER

Railway stations in France opened in 1893